"Calling All Boys" is a 1982 or 1983 single by The Flirts, a New York-based female vocal trio created by producer/songwriter Bobby Orlando.

Composition 
The song was written and produced by Bobby Orlando.

Charts 

"Passion" / "Calling All Boys"

References 

1982 songs
1983 singles
The Flirts songs
Songs written by Bobby Orlando
Song recordings produced by Bobby Orlando